David Constable is an American/Canadian engineer and businessman. He was appointed the CEO of Sasol, an energy and chemical company, in July 2011, and announced that he would leave the role in spring 2016. He concurrently served as the company's president.

Prior to his tenure at Sasol, he was employed with Fluor Corporation from 1982 to 2011. He has served on the Fluor board of directors since 2019 and serves as an independent director of ABB Group, American Petroleum Institute, and the US-China Business Council.

Constable has a civil engineering degree from the University of Alberta. He also graduated from advanced management programs at both Thunderbird School of Global Management and Wharton School of the University of Pennsylvania.

In November 2020, Fluor announced Constable’s appointment as CEO, to succeed Carlos Hernandez. 

Mr. Constable was subsequently appointed as Chairman and Chief Executive Officer of Fluor Corporation in May, 2022.

References

External links
 Corporate biography

Canadian chief executives
Living people
Year of birth missing (living people)
Place of birth missing (living people)